The 1974 FIFA World Cup was the tenth FIFA World Cup, a quadrennial football tournament for men's senior national teams, and was played in West Germany (and West Berlin) between 13 June and 7 July. The tournament marked the first time that the current trophy, the FIFA World Cup Trophy, created by the Italian sculptor Silvio Gazzaniga, was awarded. The previous trophy, the Jules Rimet Trophy, had been won for the third time by Brazil in 1970 and awarded permanently to the Brazilians. This was the first out of three World Cups to feature two rounds of group stages.

West Germany won the title, beating the Netherlands 2–1 in the final at the Olympiastadion in Munich. This was the second victory for West Germany, who had also won in 1954. Australia, East Germany, Haiti and Zaire made their first appearances at the final stage, with the latter two also making their only appearance, and East Germany making their only appearance before Germany was reunified in 1990.

Host selection

West Germany was chosen as the host nation by FIFA in London, England on 6 July 1966. Hosting rights for the 1978 and 1982 tournaments were awarded at the same time. West Germany agreed to a deal with Spain by which Spain would support West Germany for the 1974 tournament, and in return West Germany would allow Spain to bid for the 1982 World Cup unopposed.

Havelange on "planned" host winner
Speaking in 2008, former FIFA president João Havelange said to Folha de Sao Paulo that the competition, along with the 1966 FIFA World Cup, was fixed so that the host country would win: "In the three matches that the Brazilian national team played in 1966, of the three referees and six linesmen, seven were British and two were Germans. Brazil went out, Pelé 'exited' through injury [following some rough defensive play], and England and Germany entered into the final, just as the Englishman Sir Stanley Rous, who was the President of FIFA at the time, had wanted. In Germany in 1974 the same thing happened. During the Brazil-Holland match, the referee was German, we lost 2-0 and Germany won the title. We [Havelange was Brazilian] were the best in the world, and had the same team that had won the World Cup in 1962 in Chile and 1970 in Mexico, but it was planned for the host countries to win".

Qualification

Ninety-eight countries took part in the qualifying tournament.

Some of football's most successful nations did not qualify, including 1966 champions England, France, hosts and quarter-finalists of the 1970 tournament Mexico, Spain, 1966 third-place finishers Portugal, 1970 quarter-finalists Peru, Belgium, 1962 runners-up Czechoslovakia, Switzerland, Hungary, and Romania. The USSR was also disqualified after refusing to travel for the second leg of their playoff against Chile as a result of the 1973 Chilean coup d'état. The Netherlands and Poland qualified for the first time since 1938. Scotland was back in the Finals after a 16-year absence. Argentina and Chile were also back after having missed the 1970 tournament and Yugoslavia was back after missing both the 1966 and 1970 tournaments.

First-time qualifiers were East Germany (who made their sole World Cup or European Championship appearance as a separate team); Australia, which were the first team from Oceania to qualify (although they would not qualify again until the next time the tournament was held in Germany, in 2006); Haiti, the first team from the Caribbean to qualify since Cuba in 1938; and Zaire, the first team from sub-Saharan Africa to reach the finals, and the third African team overall.

As of 2022, this was the last time Haiti and Zaire (now DR Congo) qualified for a FIFA World Cup tournament, as well as the last time Spain failed to qualify.

This was the first tournament in which the defending champions (in this case Brazil) played in the opening game as opposed to the hosts, although this was later changed back to the hosts for the 2006 tournament, which was also held in Germany, as the defending champions no longer had a secured spot in the tournament.

List of qualified teams

The following 16 teams qualified for the final tournament.

AFC (0)
 None qualified
CAF (1)
 
OFC (1)
 

CONCACAF (1)
 
CONMEBOL (4)
 
 
 
 

UEFA (9)
 
 
 
 
 
 
 
  (hosts)

Format
The tournament featured a new format. While the competition once again began with the sixteen teams divided into four groups of four teams, the eight teams which advanced did not enter a knockout stage as in the previous five World Cups but instead played in a second group stage. The winners of the two groups in the second stage then played each other in the final, with the respective runners-up from each group meeting in the third place play-off. This was one of only two times that this format was deployed (1978 being the other). For the 1974 World Cup, FIFA introduced the penalty shoot-out as a means of determining the winner in knockout stages should the match end on a draw after 120 minutes. The method, however, was not put in practice as both the third-place match and the final were decided after 90 minutes. The first World Cup to feature a penalty shoot-out was the 1982 World Cup, in the semi-final match between France and West Germany.

It was decided in advance that if the host nation progressed to the second round their matches would not take place simultaneous to the other matches but instead be held in the other timeslot (either 16:00 or 19:30 local time).

Summary

First round
The tournament was held mostly in bad weather, and the stadia had few protected places. Only five western European nations had qualified, of which only the Netherlands, West Germany and Sweden made it past the group stage. Fans from the Eastern Communist neighbour states East Germany, Bulgaria and Poland were hindered by political circumstances.

Carlos Caszely of Chile became the first player to be sent off with a red card in a World Cup match, during their match against West Germany. Red cards were formally introduced in World Cup play in 1970, but no players were sent off in that tournament.

Two teams made a particularly powerful impact on the first round. The Netherlands demonstrated the "Total Football" techniques pioneered by the top Dutch club Ajax, in which specialised positions were virtually abolished for the outfield players, and individual players became defenders, midfielders or strikers as the situation required. The Dutch marked their first World Cup finals since 1938 by topping their first-round group, with wins over Uruguay and Bulgaria and a draw with Sweden. Sweden joined the Dutch in the second group round after beating Uruguay 3–0.

Poland, meanwhile, that also marked their first World Cup finals since 1938, took maximum points from a group containing two of the favourites for the tournament. They beat Argentina 3–2, trounced Haiti 7–0, then beat Italy 2–1 – a result that knocked the Italians out of the Cup and resulted in Argentina qualifying for the second group round on goal difference. Argentina would not fail to win either of their opening two games of a World Cup again until 2018. While Haiti lost all three games and finished second-to-last in the tournament, they did have one moment of glory; in their opening game against Italy, they managed to take the lead with a goal from Emmanuel Sanon, before eventually losing 3–1. That goal proved to be significant as it ended Dino Zoff's run of 1,142 minutes without conceding a goal – Italy had not conceded in their last 12 international matches.

Group 2 was a particularly close group. With Brazil, Yugoslavia and Scotland drawing all their games against each other, it was decided by the number of goals these three teams scored when defeating Zaire. Yugoslavia hammered the African nation 9–0, equalling a finals record for the largest margin of victory. Brazil beat them 3–0. Scotland however only managed a 2–0 margin, and so were edged out of the tournament on goal difference. They were the only team that did not lose a game in the tournament as well as becoming the first ever country to be eliminated from a World Cup Finals without having lost a match.

Group 1 contained both East Germany and the host West Germany, and they both progressed at the expense of Chile and newcomers Australia. The last game played in Group 1 was much anticipated, a first ever clash between the two German teams. West Germany was already assured of progression to the second round whatever the result. In one of the most politically charged matches of all time, it was the East that won, thanks to a late Jürgen Sparwasser goal. This result forced a realignment of the West German team that would later help them win the tournament.

Second round
Coincidentally, the two second-round groups both produced matches that were, in effect, semi-finals. In Group A, the Netherlands and Brazil met after each had taken maximum points from their previous two matches. In Group B, the same happened with West Germany and Poland – so the winners of these two games would contest the final.

In Group A, two goals from the inspirational Johan Cruyff helped the Dutch side thrash Argentina 4–0. At the same time, Brazil defeated East Germany 1–0. The Dutch triumphed over East Germany 2–0 while in the "Battle of the South Americans", Brazil managed to defeat Argentina 2–1 in a scrappy match. Argentina and East Germany drew 1–1 and were on their way home while the crucial match between the Netherlands and Brazil turned into another triumph for Total Football, as second-half goals from Johan Neeskens and Cruyff put the Netherlands in the final. However the match would also be remembered for harsh defending on both sides.

Meanwhile, in Group B, West Germany and Poland both managed to beat Yugoslavia and Sweden. The crucial game between the Germans and the Poles was goalless until the 76th minute, when Gerd Muller scored to send the hosts through 1–0. The Poles took third place after defeating Brazil 1–0.

Final

The final was held on 7 July 1974 at Olympiastadion, Munich. West Germany was led by Franz Beckenbauer, while the Dutch had their star Johan Cruyff, and their Total Football system which had dazzled the competition. With just a minute gone on the clock, following a solo run, Cruyff was brought down by Uli Hoeneß inside the German penalty area, and the Dutch took the lead from the ensuing penalty by Johan Neeskens before any German player had even touched the ball. West Germany struggled to recover, and in the 26th minute were awarded a penalty, after Bernd Hölzenbein fell within the Dutch area, causing English referee Jack Taylor to award another controversial penalty. Paul Breitner spontaneously decided to kick, and scored. These two penalties were the first in a World Cup final. West Germany now pushed, and in the 43rd minute, in his typical style, Gerd Müller scored what turned out to be the winning goal, and the last of his career as he retired from the national team. The second half saw chances for both sides, with Müller putting the ball in the net for a goal that was disallowed as offside. In the 85th, Hölzenbein was fouled again, but no penalty this time. Eventually, West Germany, European Champions of 1972, also won the 1974 World Cup.

This was the only case of the reigning European champions winning the World Cup, until Spain (champions of the UEFA Euro 2008) defeated the Netherlands in the South Africa 2010 FIFA World Cup Final. France have also held both trophies, albeit in a different order, at the same time by winning the 1998 World Cup followed by Euro 2000.

Joao Havelange (former FIFA President from 1974 to 1998) claimed that the 1966 and 1974 World Cups were fixed so that England and Germany would win respectively.

This was only the second time that a team had won the World Cup after losing a match in the Finals (West Germany losing to East Germany during the group stage). The previous occasion was West Germany's earlier win in 1954.

Poland's Grzegorz Lato led the tournament in scoring seven goals. Gerd Müller's goal in the final was the 14th in his career of two World Cups, beating Just Fontaine's record of 13, in his single World Cup. Müller's record was only surpassed 32 years later, in 2006 by Ronaldo's 15 goals from three World Cups and then 8 years after, in 2014 by Klose's 16 goals from four World Cups.

Günter Netzer, who came on as a substitute for West Germany during the defeat by the East Germans, was playing for Real Madrid at the time: this was the first time that a World Cup winner had played for a club outside his home country.

This is the last of four FIFA World Cup tournaments to date with no extra-time matches. The others are the 1930, 1950, and 1962 tournaments.

Mascot
The official mascots of this World Cup were Tip and Tap, two boys wearing an outfit similar to West Germany's, with the letters WM (Weltmeisterschaft, World Cup) and number 74.

Venues

Match officials
AFC
 Jafar Namdar
  Govindasamy Suppiah
CAF
 Mahmoud Mustafa Kamel
 Youssou N'Diaye
CONCACAF

 Alfonso González Archundía
 Werner Winsemann

CONMEBOL

 Ramón Barreto
 Omar Delgado Gómez
 Vicente Llobregat
 Armando Marques
 Luis Pestarino
 Edison Peréz Núñez

UEFA

 Heinz Aldinger
 Aurelio Angonese
 Doğan Babacan
 Bob Davidson
 Rudi Glöckner
 Pavel Kasakov
 Erich Linemayr
 Vital Loraux
 Károly Palotai
 Nicolae Rainea
 Pablo Sánchez Ibáñez
 Rudolf Scheurer
 Gerhard Schulenburg
 Jack Taylor
 Clive Thomas
 Kurt Tschenscher
 Arie van Gemert
 Hans-Joachim Weyland

OFC
 Tony Boskovic

Squads
For a list of all squads that appeared in the final tournament, see 1974 FIFA World Cup squads.

Seeding
The FIFA Organising Committee agreed by vote to seed the hosts, holders and the other two 1970 semi-finalists into the first position of the four groups: 
 (1970 semi-finalists and holders)
 (1970 semi-finalists)
 (1970 semi-finalists)
 (1970 semi-finalists and hosts)

Then the remaining spots in the groups were determined by dividing the participants into pots based on geographical sections. When the final draw was held, the 16th and final qualifier was not yet known; it would be either Yugoslavia or Spain subject to the result of a final playoff match in February 1974. The two teams had finished with an identical record in their qualification group, and following this situation the rules were changed, so that tied teams had to compete in a playoff match on neutral ground.

Final draw
The final draw took place at 21:30 local time on 5 January 1974 in HR Sendesaal in Frankfurt, and was televised on Eurovision. 80 commentators were gathered at the Eurovision headquarters, and TV stations from 32 countries had requested pictures of the ceremony at the time. The TV broadcast of this show was followed by an estimated 800 million people.

Ahead of the draw, the FIFA Organising Committee decided that the host nation (West Germany) and trophy holder (Brazil) would be seeded, and placed respectively into the first position of Groups 1 and 2 prior to the draw. The remaining two top-seeded teams (Uruguay and Italy) would be drawn into the first position of Group 3 and Group 4. It was also decided that South American nations could not play in the same group during the first group stage. In other words, Argentina and Chile drawn from pot 3, could not be drawn into the two groups seeded by Brazil and Uruguay.

Uruguay was drawn before Italy, taking the seeded first position of Group 3, and Italy were drawn into the seeded first position of Group 4. Next, the remaining two South American teams from pot 3 were drawn into the two top-seeded European groups (Group 1 and Group 4), as per the draw regulations. This was followed by a draw of the remaining two European teams from pot 1 into Groups 2 and 3. Finally other nations were drawn on an unseeded basis, one by one into Group 1–4 in numerical order, first from pot 2 and then from pot 4.

The "innocent hand" who made the draws was an 11-year-old boy, Detlef Lange, a member of the Schöneberger Sängerknaben, a children's choir.

The great sensation of the draw was the meeting of the two German teams in Group 1. When FIFA President Sir Stanley Rous had announced the lot, the room was quiet for a few moments, followed by long-lasting applause. In the days following the event, a rumour began circulating that East Germany would consider withdrawing from the World Cup following a meeting with the West Germany delegation; however, this was quickly and officially denied by the East German government.

First round
The first round, or first group stage, saw the 16 teams divided evenly into four groups. Each group was a round-robin of six games, where each team played each of the other teams in the same group once. Teams were awarded two points for a win, one point for a draw and none for a defeat. The teams finishing first and second in each group qualified for the second round, while the bottom two teams in each group were eliminated from the tournament.

Tie-breaking criteria

Teams were ranked on the following criteria:
 1. Greater number of points in all group matches
 2. Goal difference in all group matches 
 3. Goals scored in all group matches 
 4. Drawing of lots by the FIFA Organising Committee

Group 1

Group 2

Group 3

Group 4

Second round
The second round, or second group stage, saw the eight teams progressing from the first round divided into two groups of four teams on the basis of the tournament regulations. Group A would consist of the winners of Groups 1 and 3, plus the runners-up from Groups 2 and 4. Group B would consist of the other four teams, namely the winners of Groups 2 and 4, plus the runners-up from Group 1 and 3. Like the first group stage, each group in the second round was a round-robin of six games, where each team played one match against each of the other teams in the same group. Teams were awarded two points for a win, one point for a draw and none for a defeat. The two teams finishing first in each group advanced to the final, while the two runners-up would meet to decide third place.

Tie-breaking criteria

Teams were ranked on the following criteria:

 1. Greater number of points in all second round group matches
 2. Goal difference in all second round group matches 
 3. Goals scored in all second round group matches 
 4. Higher finishing position in the table in the first round
 5. Drawing of lots by the FIFA Organising Committee

All times listed below are at local time (UTC+1)

Group A

Group B

Knockout stage

The third place play-off was the first match in FIFA World Cup history in which a penalty shoot-out could potentially be held (in the event of the score being level after the regular 90 minutes and 30 minutes' extra time). If the teams remained tied in the final after extra time, a replay would be held. Only if the scores remained level during the replay after the regular 90 minutes and 30 minutes' extra time would penalties be used to determine the champion. At all previous World Cup tournaments, the drawing of lots had been foreseen in this situation to split the teams.

All times listed below are at local time (UTC+1)

Third place play-off

Final

Goalscorers

With seven goals, Grzegorz Lato of Poland was the top scorer in the tournament. In total, 97 goals were scored by 52 players, with two of them credited as own goals and one player scored for and against.

7 goals
 Grzegorz Lato

5 goals
 Johan Neeskens
 Andrzej Szarmach

4 goals
 Johnny Rep
 Ralf Edström
 Gerd Müller

3 goals

 René Houseman
 Rivellino
 Johan Cruyff
 Kazimierz Deyna
 Paul Breitner
 Dušan Bajević

2 goals

 Héctor Yazalde
 Jairzinho
 Joachim Streich
 Emmanuel Sanon
 Joe Jordan
 Roland Sandberg
 Wolfgang Overath
 Stanislav Karasi
 Ivica Šurjak

1 goal

 Rubén Ayala
 Carlos Babington
 Miguel Ángel Brindisi
 Ramón Heredia
 Valdomiro
 Hristo Bonev
 Sergio Ahumada
 Martin Hoffmann
 Jürgen Sparwasser
 Pietro Anastasi
 Romeo Benetti
 Fabio Capello
 Gianni Rivera
 Theo de Jong
 Ruud Krol
 Rob Rensenbrink
 Jerzy Gorgoń
 Peter Lorimer
 Conny Torstensson
 Ricardo Pavoni
 Rainer Bonhof
 Bernhard Cullmann
 Jürgen Grabowski
 Uli Hoeneß
 Vladislav Bogićević
 Dragan Džajić
 Josip Katalinski
 Branko Oblak
 Ilija Petković

Own goals
 Roberto Perfumo (for Italy)
 Colin Curran (for East Germany)
 Ruud Krol (for Bulgaria)

FIFA retrospective ranking
In 1986, FIFA published a report that ranked all teams in each World Cup up to and including 1986, based on progress in the competition, overall results and quality of the opposition. The rankings for the 1974 tournament were as follows:

Notes 

Scotland were the only unbeaten team in the finals tournament, beating Zaire and drawing with Brazil and Yugoslavia in the first round. Even West Germany, the eventual champions, lost to neighbours East Germany in their group stage match.

References

External links

1974 FIFA World Cup Germany, FIFA.com
FIFA Technical Report
Details at RSSSF

 
World Cup
FIFA World Cup tournaments
International association football competitions hosted by Germany
June 1974 sports events in Europe
July 1974 sports events in Europe